Lehigh Valley United (also referred to as LVU) is an American soccer team based in Bethlehem, Pennsylvania. Founded in 2009, the team plays in USL League Two, the fourth tier of the American Soccer Pyramid.

The team plays its home games at Rocco Calvo Field on the campus of Moravian College. The team's colors are navy blue and white.

History
Lehigh Valley United was founded in 2009 by the non-profit organization Soccer Association of the Lehigh Valley (SALV) to field a top-level team in the National Premier Soccer League, considered the fourth division of the American soccer pyramid and roughly equal to the USL Premier Development League, while also supporting youth development and coaching.

The team originally took its name from its youth club affiliate, FC Lehigh Valley United, and adopted "Sonic" from a corporate partnership with American restaurant chain, Sonic Drive-In, in a deal that lasted three seasons. This was also reflected in the club's logo, which was changed following the conclusion of the deal in 2012. The team shares its history and many former players with the successful Pennsylvania Stoners team, which won the NPSL Championship in 2008 but left the league at the end of the 2009 season.

The Sonic had a successful first season, finishing first in Northeast Division/Keystone Conference and making it to the national semi-finals in the playoffs. Following a second place divisional finish in 2011, the club returned to first place in 2012 and defeated Chattanooga FC 1-0 in the National Championship game on July 29, 2012, winning their first league title. Since 2010, Sonic has posted a remarkable league and playoff record of 46 Wins, 4 draws, and 7 Losses. In 2013, Sonic represented the NPSL in US Soccer's Inaugural Amateur National Championship. After beating the Croatian Eagles (WI) in the national semi-final (1-0) Sonic then played the Carolina Dynamo (PDL) in the final losing 3-1 in penalty kicks (1-1 regulation)

FC Lehigh Valley United Sonic joined the USL PDL on November 18, 2014.

Year-by-year

Honors

Domestic
National Premier Soccer League
 National Champions (1): 2012 (Also, 2008 Champions as PA Stoners)
Keystone Division Titles (NPSL):
 Winners (2): 2010, 2012, 
Northeast Conference Champions (3): 2010, 2012, 2013'''

Stadium
 Ulrich Sports Complex at Lehigh University, Bethlehem, Pennsylvania (2010–2012)
 Whitehall High School Sports Complex, Whitehall High School, Whitehall Township, Pennsylvania (2013–present)

References

2009 establishments in Pennsylvania
Association football clubs established in 2009
Soccer clubs in Pennsylvania
Sports in Bethlehem, Pennsylvania
USL League Two teams